The Bodkin Island Light (or Bodkin Point Light) was a lighthouse on the Chesapeake Bay, United States, the first erected in Maryland.

History
The lighthouse was constructed as an aid to shipping entering Baltimore; it was built on Bodkin Island (not to be confused with an island of the same name located south of Kent Island), and was the first lighthouse in Maryland.  The station was built by Thomas Evans and William Coppeck, who completed the  stone tower and attached one-story keeper's dwelling in October 1821.  Thirteen lamps were purchased from Winslow Lewis, and the station was formally inaugurated in January 1822.

The lighthouse was plagued by problems stemming from its poor construction during much of its brief existence, and it was replaced in 1856 by the Seven Foot Knoll Light in the Patapsco River.  A fisherman is said to have lived in the dwelling for a time, but eventually the island was completely abandoned; the old tower collapsed in 1914.  Today, Bodkin Island has disappeared, eaten away by erosion.  What remains of the site is marked as a "navigational hazard" on sea charts.

See also

List of lighthouses in Maryland
List of lighthouses in the United States

References

External links

Chesapeake Chapter, USLHS page
Series of photographs detailing loss of the tower

Lighthouses completed in 1822
Lighthouses in Anne Arundel County, Maryland
Lighthouses in the Chesapeake Bay
1822 establishments in Maryland